The 2012–13 Loyola Ramblers men's basketball team represented Loyola University Chicago during the 2012–13 NCAA Division I men's basketball season. The Ramblers, led by second year head coach Porter Moser, played their home games at the Joseph J. Gentile Arena and were members of the Horizon League. They finished the season 15–16, 5–11 in Horizon League play to finish in seventh place. They lost in the first round of the Horizon League tournament to Youngstown State.

This was the Ramblers final season as a member of the Horizon League. In July, 2013 they will become a member of the Missouri Valley Conference.

Roster

Schedule

|-
!colspan=9| Exhibition

|-
!colspan=9| Regular season

|-
!colspan=9|Horizon League tournament

References

Loyola Ramblers men's basketball seasons
Loyola
Loyola Ramblers
Loyola Ramblers